The Omari Brigades was a Syrian rebel group formed in the Lajat region in Daraa Governorate as the first FSA group formed in the province. It received TOW missiles and has been supplied and funded by Saudi Arabia. It is part of the Alliance of Southern Forces. The group is named after the Omari Mosque in Daraa city.

History
The group's leader, Captain Al Qatahneh, was killed in a gun battle with an opposition activist named Qaisar Habib on 28 August 2014. The activist, severely wounded and admitted to a hospital, was murdered on 19 October by Omari Brigades fighters. In 2016, the group participated in the fight between the Syrian opposition and two Islamic State of Iraq and the Levant-affiliated groups, the Yarmouk Martyrs Brigade and the Islamic Muthanna Movement. On 1 April, ISIL attempted to assassinate Fares Adib al-Baydar, the former brigade leader.

See also
List of armed groups in the Syrian Civil War

References

Anti-government factions of the Syrian civil war
Military units and formations disestablished in 2018